Marco Firenze (born 26 June 1993) is an Italian professional footballer who plays as a midfielder for  club Sangiuliano.

Career
In July 2012, Firenze moved to Pontedera on a year-long loan deal.

On 12 July 2019, Firenze signed to Serie B club Salernitana. On 31 January 2020, he returned to Venezia on loan with an option to buy. On 4 October 2020 he was loaned to Novara. On 25 January 2021 he moved on a new loan to Padova. On 27 August 2021, his Salernitana contract was terminated by mutual consent.

On 13 September 2021, he signed with Paganese in Serie C.

On 11 January 2023, Firenze joined Sangiuliano.

References

External links
 

1993 births
Footballers from Genoa
Living people
Italian footballers
Association football midfielders
Parma Calcio 1913 players
U.S. Pistoiese 1921 players
U.S. Città di Pontedera players
A.C. Giacomense players
A.C. Tuttocuoio 1957 San Miniato players
U.S.D. Sestri Levante 1919 players
F.C. Crotone players
U.S. Catanzaro 1929 players
A.C.N. Siena 1904 players
Paganese Calcio 1926 players
F.C. Pro Vercelli 1892 players
Venezia F.C. players
U.S. Salernitana 1919 players
Novara F.C. players
Calcio Padova players
F.C. Sangiuliano City players
Serie B players
Serie C players
Serie D players